Maria Velotti (16 November 1826 - 3 September 1886) - in religion Maria Luigia del Santissimo Sacramento - was an Italian Roman Catholic professed religious and the founder of the Suore Francescane Adoratrici della Santa Croce and a member in the Third Order of Saint Francis. In her childhood she was raised in two different households after her parents died and she was exposed to the Franciscan charism under her second spiritual director. In 1854 she was professed into the Franciscan Third Order and in 1877 founded her religious order. Velotti also experienced several visions in her life such as visions of Jesus Christ and Francis of Assisi.

Her beatification cause launched in the 1920s and she became titled as a Servant of God. Pope Francis confirmed her heroic virtue and titled her as Venerable in 2016 while later approving a miracle attributed to her in 2019 which would enable for her beatification. It was scheduled to be held on 16 May 2020 but the COVID-19 pandemic forced its postponement. The celebration was rescheduled and celebrated on 26 September 2020.

Life
Maria Velotti was born in Soccavo in Naples on 16 November 1826 to Francesco Velotti and Teresa Napoletano. Her baptism was celebrated on that same date in the Santi Pietro e Paolo church in Soccavo.

Her parents died before she turned two circa 1828 and she was sent to live with her unmarried aunt Caterina (who lived in Sirico near Nola) who would over time come to mistreat and abuse her. Her half-brother Giovanni (from her father's first marriage) remained in Soccavo and a chance meeting between the two in adulthood revealed their familial connection. Her initial education came from the local parish priest since there were no public schools in the area at that time and in her childhood was sometimes referred to as "Mariella". Her aunt's abuse extended to her spiritual life and she would often be assigned to housework so that she could not reflect on God in silence; her housework often took over two hours. But her situation became untenable at home and her married (and childless) neighbors Lorenzo Sabatino and Giuseppa Tuzzolo took her in and raised her as their own. Velotti could barely read or write.

In her adolescence her first spiritual director and confessor was the priest Domenico Piciocchi but a chance meeting put her in contact with her second confessor and spiritual director when she turned 23. The teen met the priest Filippo Antonio da Domicella (who happened to be visiting the church) and under him she fostered a desire to join the Franciscans. The priest oversaw her vesting in the habit in the San Giovanni Evangelista convent-church in Taurano on 2 February 1853 and oversaw her profession into the Third Order of Saint Francis on 22 February 1854. Velotti took her religious name in honor of Aloysius Gonzaga and Paschal Baylón. In 1853 she started to experience visions of Jesus Christ on the cross alongside the Blessed Mother and Francis of Assisi; she also experienced visions of demonic harassment that once left her immobile and bedridden. Velotti also used iron tools for self-mortification.

Her order was established in 1877 (alongside the widow Eletta Albini who later became Sister Maria Francesca) and it was aimed at educating girls and to promote the role of women in Neapolitan life. Her intention was also to dedicate herself to various charitable initiatives throughout Naples. Permission for the order's founding came from both the Cardinal Archbishop of Naples Sisto Riario Sforza and the Minister General of the Order of Friars Minor Bernardino da Portogruaro. Her reputation for piousness and her visions extended to the surrounding regions and Sforza (before his death in 1877) visited Velotti several times in order to better acquaint himself with her and understand her ideas. Her third spiritual director (she was hesitant in having another director) was Michelangelo da Marigliano. In 1884 she relocated to Casoria to the motherhouse where she would live until her death and spent her last weeks in a wheelchair with paralysis.

Her death came after suffering from ill health for a prolonged period; she died in the order's motherhouse on 3 September 1886 at 9:00am in Casoria. Her remains have been housed in the order's motherhouse since 26 December 1926.

Beatification
The informative process for her beatification opened on 26 September 1927 and concluded a decade later on 22 December 1936; theologians assessed her writings and confirmed on 3 December 1944 that her few writings were in line with doctrine and were not in contravention. The second process in Naples was launched decades later on 2 October 2000 and concluded on 14 March 2001 before the Congregation for the Causes of Saints validated both processes on 14 December 2007 to enable further investigation.

The Positio dossier (detailing her life and reputation for saintliness) was given to the C.C.S. in 2010 with historians on 12 April 2011 voicing their approval for the cause. Theologians also issued their approval on 28 October 2014 as did the cardinal and bishop members of the C.C.S. on 19 January 2016. Pope Francis acknowledged her heroic virtue on 21 January 2016 and titled Velotti as Venerable. Francis later confirmed a miracle attributed to her on 11 December 2019 which enabled for Velotti to be beatified in Naples on 16 May 2020. The date for her beatification was postponed due to the COVID-19 pandemic but rescheduled and celebrated in Naples on 26 September 2020.

The current postulator for this cause is the Franciscan Giovangiuseppe Califano.

References

External links
 Hagiography Circle

1826 births
1886 deaths
19th-century Italian Roman Catholic religious sisters and nuns
19th-century venerated Christians
Beatifications by Pope Francis
Founders of Catholic religious communities
Italian beatified people
Venerated Catholics by Pope Francis